Phymatopus hectoides is a species of moth belonging to the family Hepialidae. It was described by Jean Baptiste Boisduval in 1868, and is known from the western United States, including California, Arizona, Nevada and Oregon.

The wingspan is about 27 mm. The forewings are medium grayish brown with mottling and diffuse white patches along the costa. There are two oblique lines edged with brownish red which cross the wing in the median and subterminal areas. The hindwings are uniformly grayish brown. Adults are on wing from May to July.

The larvae feed on Baccharis, Horkelia, Lupinus, Helenium, Eriophyllum, Scrophularia and fern species. They bore in the shoots and roots of their host plant.

References

Hepialidae
Moths described in 1868
Moths of North America
Taxa named by Jean Baptiste Boisduval